Catherine Island is an island in the Alexander Archipelago of southeastern Alaska, United States. It is part of the City and Borough of Sitka and lies just off the northeast corner of Baranof Island, separated from it by Portage Arm. The U.S. Forest Service named Catherine Island in 1935 after Catherine I of Russia.  Catherine Island has a land area of 86.936 km2 (33.566 sq mi) and no resident population.

References

Catherine Island: Block 1040, Census Tract 1, Sitka City and Borough, Alaska United States Census Bureau

Islands of the Alexander Archipelago
Islands of Sitka, Alaska
Islands of Alaska